Phyllonorycter longispinata is a moth of the family Gracillariidae. It is known from the islands of Hokkaidō and Honshū in Japan.

The larvae feed on Alnus hirsuta and Alnus japonica. They mine the leaves of their host plant. The mine has the form of a ptychonome, yellowish- or brownish-green, rather elongate, large mine on the underside of the leaf, between two veins.

References

longispinata
Moths of Japan
Moths described in 1958